The Aiguille de la Tsa is a mountain of the Swiss Pennine Alps, overlooking Arolla in the canton of Valais. It lies on the range culminating at the Dent de Perroc, between the valley of Arolla and the Mont Miné Glacier.

References

External links

Aiguille de la Tsa on Hikr

Mountains of Valais
Mountains of the Alps
Alpine three-thousanders
Mountains of Switzerland